Jason Gaisie (born 13 February 1989), popularly known as Pappy Kojo, is a Ghanaian hip hop and hiplife recording artist from Takoradi. He is well known for his hit single "Realer No".

Early life and education 
Jason Gaisie was born on 13 February 1989 to parents Kofi Badu and Rosemond Gaisie. He was born and raised in Takoradi, in the Western Region of Ghana. He attended Ridge International School up until 2004, then went to Italy to be with his mother.

Music career 
Pappy Kojo showed his interest and love for music at an early age. He took part in locally organized rap shows where he would rap to Obrafour, Tic Tac, Reggie Rockstone, and Lord Kenya. His biggest musical influences are Obrafour, The Shady Aftermath Camp and Michael Jackson. After leaving Ghana for Italy in 2004, his love for rap music grew even greater. He began covering popular songs and posting them on his YouTube channel.

Around the same time, he began recording his own material with Italian and Ghanaian music producers. This created some buzz for the young rapper. He grew in popularity in the latter part of 2014 when he collaborated on a smash hit record with Ghanaian superstar Joey B.

Pappy then followed with his first official single, "Realer No", also featuring Joey B. He went to South Africa with Joey B to perform at the Big Brother finale.

He was nominated three times at the 2015 Ghana Music Awards and won an award for the Hip-Hop Song of the Year. He has also been nominated for the Best Newcomer in Africa at the AFRIMMA Awards.

He has released three singles since: "Ay3 Late", "2 Raw" (with Edem) and "Deja Vu" (with Jiggy).

2021-present:Logos II
On March 12, 2021, Pappy  debut studio album Logos II, was released. The albums  features  Busiswa.

Awards and nominations

Ghana Music Awards

AFRIMMA Awards

MTN 4Syte Music Video Awards

Discography

Studio albums 
 Logos II (2021)

Major singles
 Realer No featuring Joey B Produced by Slimbo
 Ay3late featuring Sarkodie Produced by Kuvie

References

External links
 Official Facebook Page

1989 births
Ghanaian rappers
Living people
People from Western Region (Ghana)